Mirco Spighi (born 27 August 1990) is an Italian football player who plays for Serie D club Savignanese Calcio.

Club career
He made his Serie C debut for Alessandria on 30 August 2014 in a game against Mantova.

References

External links
 

1990 births
Living people
People from Forlimpopoli
Footballers from Emilia-Romagna
Italian footballers
Association football midfielders
Forlì F.C. players
Rimini F.C. 1912 players
Campionato Sammarinese di Calcio players
U.S. Alessandria Calcio 1912 players
S.P.A.L. players
S.S. Teramo Calcio players
U.S. Catanzaro 1929 players
Serie B players
Serie C players
Serie D players
Sportspeople from the Province of Forlì-Cesena